The Salt of Tears is a 2020 black-and-white drama film directed by Philippe Garrel. It stars Logann Antuofermo, Oulaya Amamra, Louise Chevillotte, Souheila Yacoub, and André Wilms. It tells the story of a young man who falls in love with three women. The film had its world premiere in the Competition section at the 70th Berlin International Film Festival on 22 February 2020.

Premise
An aspiring carpenter Luc travels to Paris to take the examination for a joinery school. He has a brief relationship with Djemila. Subsequently, he goes back to his rural hometown, where he lives with his father. Luc sleeps with his former girlfriend Geneviève. He moves to Paris and falls in love with another woman named Betsy.

Cast

Production
The film was co-written by Philippe Garrel with his longtime collaborators Arlette Langmann and Jean-Claude Carrière. Principal photography began on 2 April 2019.

Release
The film had its world premiere in the Competition section at the 70th Berlin International Film Festival on 22 February 2020. It was originally scheduled to be released in France on 8 April 2020, but it was then delayed to 14 October 2020 due to the COVID-19 pandemic. The film was then removed from the release calendar.

Reception
On Metacritic, the film has a weighted average score of 62 out of 100, based on 11 critics, indicating "generally favorable reviews".

Eric Kohn of IndieWire gave the film a grade of B, commenting that "there's an undeniable allure to the way the movie hovers in an ambiguous space between Luc's passions and their problematic connotations." Peter Bradshaw of The Guardian gave the film 3 out of 5 stars, writing, "It is a watchable, insouciant love story with some great incidental performances, although there is a sense of the shark being jumped 30 minutes from the end." Boyd van Hoeij of The Hollywood Reporter wrote, "Though set in the present, the grainy black-and-white images and [Jean-Louis] Aubert's familiar-sounding, piano-led score again lend the story something timeless." Meanwhile, Diego Semerene of Slant Magazine gave the film 1.5 out of 4 stars, writing, "[Philippe] Garrel illustrates the absurdity behind the myth of the complementary couple with the same cynicism that permeates his previous work but none of the humor or wit." Guy Lodge of Variety wrote, "A minor romantic roundelay that deviates little from the essential template of his last three films, it's very much the work of an artist less preoccupied with innovation than with signature craftsmanship."

References

External links
 
 https://www.metacritic.com/movie/the-salt-of-tears/critic-reviews 

2020 films
French drama films
2020s French-language films
Films directed by Philippe Garrel
Films postponed due to the COVID-19 pandemic
Swiss drama films
French-language Swiss films
2020s French films